Chloe Rose Fineman (born July 20, 1988) is an American actress, comedian, impressionist, and writer. Fineman became a featured player on the NBC sketch comedy series Saturday Night Live starting in its 45th season in September 2019, and was promoted to repertory status in 2021 at the beginning of season 47.

Early life
Fineman's parents are painter Ellen Gunn and KineMed executive David Fineman. She has two sisters, visual artist Emma and CrossFit athlete Alexia (Leka). Her father is Jewish and her mother is a "WASP." Fineman was raised attending Camp Kee Tov, a Jewish day camp at Congregation Beth El in Berkeley.

She graduated from Piedmont High School in 2006. The school's acting teacher described her as "equally brilliant with comedy and drama". As a junior, Fineman directed Metamorphoses by Mary Zimmerman; as a senior, she directed The Vagina Monologues by Eve Ensler; she also performed lead roles in The Visit by Friedrich Dürrenmatt and Crimes of the Heart by Beth Henley. Since her graduation, she has returned to the school to direct plays and lead workshops.

While in high school, Fineman impersonated a peafowl on the Late Show with David Letterman after winning a bird calling competition.

Fineman studied at the New York University Tisch School of the Arts and Stella Adler Studio, graduating in 2011.

Career
After graduating from college, Fineman moved to Los Angeles, where she performed in The Groundlings troupe's Sunday Company. She also performed in "Characters Welcome" at the Upright Citizens Brigade Theatre. In 2018, she was recognized as a "New Face" at the Just for Laughs festival in Montreal, and she was nominated for Best Comedian at the 2019 Shorty Awards. Her television appearances include Jane the Virgin and Search Party.

She maintains an online presence known in particular for her celebrity impressions in front-facing camera comedy videos. On Instagram, she has posted celebrity impressions as well as clips from her Groundlings work and stand-up comedy. On YouTube, she has done character impressions. In 2018, Vulture critic Luke Kelly-Clyne wrote that after seeing Fineman do impressions of Meryl Streep and others, "As I found out, that extra bit of genius she possesses – that intangible thing that takes a good impression to a great impression – is rooted in her ability to create entirely original characters who feel as real as anyone you've ever met," concluding, "Chloe Fineman is absolutely one of the most talented new performers right now, and she's long overdue for a break."

Saturday Night Live
Fineman's addition to the cast of Saturday Night Live, the long-running NBC sketch-comedy show, as a featured player was announced on September 12, 2019, along with the addition of Bowen Yang and Shane Gillis. Alongside Yang and Heidi Gardner, Fineman was cited as the season's MVP by Andy Hoglund at Entertainment Weekly. Her promotion to Repertory Status was announced on September 27, 2021, shortly before the show's 47th season began.

Fineman's celebrity impressions on SNL include Drew Barrymore, Carole Baskin, Reese Witherspoon, Timothée Chalamet, Tiffany Trump, Lauren Boebert, Nicole Kidman, Marilyn Monroe, Nancy Pelosi, Sara Haines, Marianne Williamson, Diane Keaton (as Nina Banks from Father of the Bride), Jennifer Coolidge, Amie Donald (as M3GAN), Katy Tur, Jamie Lee Curtis, Chanel West Coast, and Britney Spears.

Filmography

Film

Television

References

External links
 
 

1988 births
Living people
21st-century American actresses
21st-century American comedians
21st-century American Jews
21st-century American women
21st-century American women writers
21st-century American writers
American film actresses
American impressionists (entertainers)
American people of English descent
American sketch comedians
American stand-up comedians
American television actresses
American women comedians
American women television writers
Actresses from Berkeley, California
Comedians from California
Jewish American actresses
Jewish American female comedians
Tisch School of the Arts alumni
Writers from Berkeley, California